Sturle Dagsland is a Norwegian artist and musical outfit from Stavanger, consisting of the brothers Sturle Dagsland and Sjur Dagsland.

They have toured extensively all across the world at festivals such as Secret Solstice, Sled Island, Fiestas del Pilar, Tallinn Music Week, Fusion Festival, South by Southwest, Canadian Music Week, Oslo Jazzfestival, and more. In 2015, they made their North American debut at Sled Island in Canada.

References 

Living people
Norwegian songwriters
21st-century Norwegian singers
Alternative rock singers
Avant-garde singers
Norwegian electronic musicians
Experimental musicians
Norwegian rock musicians
Year of birth missing (living people)